Ger Cafferkey (born 5 August 1987) is a former Gaelic footballer who plays for Ballina Stephenites and the Mayo county team.

Playing career
Cafferkey studied at NUI Galway. While there he played for the university team.

Cafferkey played in the 2006 All-Ireland Minor Football Championship final loss to Down. He won three Connacht Under-21 Football Championships between 2006 and 2008. He also won an All-Ireland Under-21 Football Championship in 2006, while playing at full back. He first played senior championship for his county in 2009 against New York. His first of six Connacht Senior Championship medals followed in his first season.

Cafferkey started at full back in the 2012 All-Ireland Senior Football Championship Final, which Mayo lost by 0-13 to 2-11 against Donegal. Cafferkey also started at full back in the 2013 All-Ireland Senior Football Championship Final but Mayo lost again, but by a single point, this time to Dublin.

Cafferkey was named in the 2012 All Star football team in the full back position. He was nominated again the following year, though did not win.

Cafferkey sustained a serious hamstring injury in 2016.

Cafferkey announced his retirement from inter-county football via social media on Monday 9 September 2019, having made 104 appearances in league and championship for his county team. Due to his preference for defence he never scored for Mayo in either the league or the championship. His last appearance was against Dublin at Croke Park in the 2019 National Football League, having won the man of the match award in the previous game against Cavan but limping off the field at Croke Park in the first half with one of his customary hamstring injuries, and then having his championship season curtailed by injury. Cafferkey's announcement followed swiftly from a similar one by Andy Moran.

Cafferkey did not seek the media spotlight. He only twice appeared before the media: in 2013 (the league defeat of Kerry) and 2019 (the previously mentioned league game against Cavan) to collect two man of the match awards.

Honours

Team
 All-Ireland Senior Football Championship runner-up: 2012, 2013
 Connacht Senior Football Championship: 2009, 2011, 2012, 2013, 2014, 2015
 All-Ireland Under-21 Football Championship: 2006
 Connacht Under-21 Football Championship: 2006, 2007, 2008
 All-Ireland Minor Football Championship runner-up: 2006

Individual
 All Star: 2012, nominated 2013
 Man of the match: v Kerry in the 2013 NFL and v Cavan in the 2019 NFL

References

External links
2012 All Star Team Announcement

1987 births
Living people
Alumni of the University of Galway
Ballina Stephenites Gaelic footballers
Gaelic football backs
Irish engineers
Mayo inter-county Gaelic footballers
University of Galway Gaelic footballers
People from Castlebar